Kasi Fine (born 20 March 1964) is a Tongan former rugby union player who played as lock.

Career
Fine debuted for Tonga in the 1987 Rugby World Cup, playing all of the three pool stage matches against Canada, Wales and Ireland. His final cap for Tonga was against Fiji, in Nadi, on 8 October 1988. He played throughout in all of his career 4 matches, never scoring.

References

External links

1964 births
Living people
Tongan rugby union players
Rugby union locks
Tonga international rugby union players